Brownie Mae Humphrey (May 25, 1913 – September 24, 1992) professionally Brownie Wise, was a pioneering American saleswoman largely responsible for the success of the home products company Tupperware, through her development of the "party plan" system of marketing.

Career
A former sales representative for Stanley Home Products, Wise was a divorcee with a son to support. She found Tupperware to be a product with broad appeal and began selling it at home parties. In 1950 she moved to Florida and created a social networking marketing system through dealers and sellers that quickly outsold Tupperware's store sales.

This caught the attention of Earl Tupper, Tupperware's inventor, who invited her to be vice president of Tupperware Home Parties in 1951. She insisted that he market his products exclusively through party plans, where women invited friends and neighbors to a combination social event and sales presentation. Wise ran the sales division, Tupperware Home Parties, Inc, from Kissimmee, Florida and had the freedom to implement her marketing strategies. Her methods were extremely successful. Her ability to tap into popular culture and the desire for happiness helped recruit thousands of women into a career at a time when a woman's role was conventionally tied to the home. Her TV appearances, magazine and newspaper articles made her a household name. In 1954 she became the first woman to appear on the cover of Business Week.

Wise invented much of the corporate culture of Tupperware and, by extension, other party-plan marketing organizations.  She was especially keen on incentives, one of the chief ones being trips to Florida to the annual "Jubilee" at the company's sales headquarters for motivational meetings and socializing with other successful representatives. Top sellers would be presented with exotic gifts such as speedboats, trips and appliances carefully planned in the company of their husbands. She created idioms and rituals such as pilgrimage to a specially designed well in the Tupperware grounds for sellers to cast their wishes, "Brownie Wings" and costumed graduation ceremonies. Dealers would go on treasure hunts where prizes would be buried in the ground. Extravagant shows, parties and motivational talks made up the four-day convention.

Wise was presented to the company's representatives as something of an idealized 1950s woman. She was skilled in leveraging the social networking model and motivating thousands of women to come together in their homes to sell Tupperware. Her own relationship with Earl Tupper was volatile, and their differences became irreconcilable after Wise's success turned her into a celebrity. In January 1958 Tupper forced Wise out. Soon afterward, every reference to her was removed from company literature. She owned no stock and left with a severance package of one year's salary, about $30,000.

Wise attempted to form her own party-plan cosmetics company, Cinderella, but was unsuccessful. She died in 1992 in Florida, where she lived and owned land near Lake Tohopekaliga.

In popular culture

Wise was to be portrayed by Sandra Bullock in a movie based on the book Tupperware Unsealed, written by Bob Kealing.

In 2016, the Tupperware company donated $200,000 to Florida's Osceola County to establish a conservation area and a "Brownie Wise Park" on an island in Lake Tohopekaliga.

Bibliography
Best wishes, Brownie Wise (1957) 
Tupperware! on PBS American Experience
PBS American Experience: Biography of Brownie Wise
Tupperware: An Open Container During a Decade of Containment, Alyssa Velazquez, Women's History Magazine, March 2014, Issue 74, p19-26

References

External links
The American Storyteller Radio Journal – Hear an online story about Brownie Wise
Tupperware! – Brownie Wise PBS' American Experience
Don Wildman and The Mysteries at the Museum – Blast from the Past Season 0, Episode 39. How Brownie Wise made Tupperware the life of the party.

 Guide to the Brownie Wise Papers, Archives Center, National Museum of American History

1913 births
1992 deaths
American businesspeople in retailing
People from Buford, Georgia
People from Kissimmee, Florida
20th-century American businesspeople
20th-century American businesswomen
People associated with direct selling